Tryggvi Helgason (born 24 July 1963) is an Icelandic breaststroke swimmer. He competed in two events at the 1984 Summer Olympics.

References

External links
 

1963 births
Living people
Tryggvi Helgason
Tryggvi Helgason
Swimmers at the 1984 Summer Olympics
Place of birth missing (living people)